The Male Choir of St Petersburg is a Russian choir that moved to the City of St Petersburg in the 18th century from Moscow.  At the end of the 19th century, the choir numbered 90: 40 adults and 50 boys (women were not admitted).  Of the 22 basses, 7 were bassi profondi, most notably Vladimir Pasyoukov and Vladimir Miller, who were capable of reaching bottom G easily. The choir utilized private study with Italian methods.

Discography
The Male Choir Of St. Petersburg - Vadim Afanasiev (EMI Classics)

See also
 Vladimir Pasyoukov
 Vladimir Miller
 Oktavist
 Russian Orthodox chant

References

Boys' and men's choirs
Russian musical groups